The Kiyosu-e Formation is a Middle Jurassic (Callovian) to Early Cretaceous (Berriasian) geologic formation of the Toyonishi Group in Yamaguchi Prefecture, Japan. Fossil ornithopod tracks have been reported from the formation.

Fossil content 
The following fossils have been reported from the formation:
 Ichnofossils
 Iguanodontidae indet.
 Theropoda indet.
 Flora
 Regnellites nagashimae
 Otozamites sp.

See also 
 List of dinosaur-bearing rock formations
 List of stratigraphic units with ornithischian tracks
 Ornithopod tracks

References

Bibliography 

  
 
 

Geologic formations of Japan
Jurassic System of Asia
Jurassic Japan
Callovian Stage
Oxfordian Stage
Kimmeridgian Stage
Tithonian Stage
Lower Cretaceous Series of Asia
Cretaceous Japan
Berriasian Stage
Sandstone formations
Siltstone formations
Fluvial deposits
Ichnofossiliferous formations
Paleontology in Japan